Kurchenko is a rural locality (a selo) and the administrative center of Kurchensky Selsoviet, Narimanovsky District, Astrakhan Oblast, Russia. The population was 423 as of 2010. There are 4 streets.

Geography 
Kurchenko is located 80 km southwest of Narimanov (the district's administrative centre) by road. Turkmenka is the nearest rural locality.

References 

Rural localities in Narimanovsky District